Bujanica is a part of the Stryjno Drugie in the administrative district of Gmina Rybczewice, within Świdnik County, Lublin Voivodeship. It lies approximately 9 kilometers north-west of Rybczewice, 37 kilometers south-east of the voivodeship capital Lublin, and 29 kilometers south-east of the county capital Świdnik.

Villages in Świdnik County